Veo is a form of the Spanish word "ver", meaning "to see". Veo or VEO may also refer to:

 Veo River, in Alcudia de Veo
 VEO, for Vostochno-Evropeiskaya Ovcharka, a term for the East-European Shepherd
Veo (planthopper), an insect genus in the Delphacini